Kahkwa Country Club is a Donald Ross designed golf course located in Erie, Pennsylvania. It was founded in 1893. It hosted the 1958 Women's Western Open. It also hosted the  2016 U.S. Women’s Mid-Amateur.

References

External links

Golf clubs and courses in Pennsylvania
1893 establishments in Pennsylvania